The Great K & A Train Robbery is a 1926 American silent Western film directed by Lewis Seiler and starring Tom Mix and Dorothy Dwan. The film is based on the actual foiling of a train robbery by Dick Gordon as related by Paul Leicester Ford in his book The Great K & A Train Robbery originally published as a serial in Lippincott's Monthly Magazine in 1896.

Plot
Following a series of robberies of the K & A Railroad, detective Tom Gordon is hired to uncover the mystery. Disguised as a bandit, Tom boards the train of K & A President Cullen. Cullen's daughter, Madge, senses that Tom is not a criminal and soon falls in love with him. Madge is sought after by Burton, her father's secretary, who is in league with the bandits. Tom eventually discovers his duplicity, and with the aid of Tony, his horse, rounds up the villains and wins the hand of Madge.

Cast
 Tom Mix as Tom Gordon 
 Tony the Horse as Tony, Tom's Horse 
 Dorothy Dwan as Madge Cullen
 Will Walling as Eugene Cullen 
 Harry Gripp as DeLuxe Harry 
 Carl Miller as Burton Holt
 Edward Peil Sr. as Bill Tolfree
 Curtis 'Snowball' McHenry as Snowball 
 Sammy Cohen as Man in upper berth of train (uncredited)

Future Western film icon John Wayne worked as a property assistant (props boy) on the film and appeared as an extra.

Film locations
Much of the film was shot on location in and around Glenwood Springs, Colorado. The film is notable for its use of breathtaking locations including shots along the Colorado River. Local residents gathered every day for three weeks to watch Mix and his famous horse, Tony, perform their own stunts. Many locals were used as extras. Mix brought the fifty-five cast and crew members, along with his family, to Colorado in two Pullman train cars along with two special baggage cars.
 
 Glenwood Springs, Colorado
 Royal Gorge, Colorado
 Shoshone Dam in Glenwood Canyon

See also
 Tom Mix filmography

References

External links

 
 
 
 
 The Great K & A Train Robbery New York: Dodd, Mead and Co., 1897

1926 films
American black-and-white films
Fox Film films
Films directed by Lewis Seiler
Films shot in Colorado
1926 Western (genre) films
Rail transport films
1896 non-fiction books
Silent American Western (genre) films
1920s American films